Brian George Jerling (born 13 August 1958), is a South African Test and One Day International umpire. He first officiated in a game in October 2000, in a game between South Africa and New Zealand. He has since umpired in more than 90 ODI games. Jerling has been umpire in four Test matches, all coming in 2006.

International umpiring statistics

See also
 List of Test cricket umpires
 List of One Day International cricket umpires
 List of Twenty20 International cricket umpires

References

External links

1958 births
Living people
South African Test cricket umpires
South African One Day International cricket umpires
South African Twenty20 International cricket umpires
Sportspeople from Port Elizabeth